Salehabad District is a district (bakhsh) in Bahar County, Hamadan Province, Iran. At the 2006 census, the population was 27,884, in 6,483 families.  The District has one city: Salehabad. The District has two rural districts (dehestan): Deymkaran Rural District and Salehabad Rural District.

References 

Bahar County
Districts of Hamadan Province